Eisman is a surname. Notable people with the surname include:
 Harry Eisman (1913-1979), a young American deported to the USSR in the 1930s.
Hy Eisman (born 1927), American cartoonist
Steve Eisman (born 1962), American money manager

See also
 Eismann